Jack Black was a rat-catcher and mole destroyer from Battersea, England during the middle of the nineteenth century. Black cut a striking figure in his self-made "uniform" of a green topcoat, scarlet waistcoat, and breeches, with a huge leather sash inset with cast-iron rats. Black promoted himself as the Queen's official rat-catcher, but he never held a royal warrant.

Biography

Jack Black is known particularly through Henry Mayhew's account in London Labour and the London Poor, where he tells Mayhew of his work and experiences, including a number of occasions when he nearly died from infection following rat bites.

When he caught any unusually coloured rats, he bred them, to establish new colour varieties. He would sell his home-bred domesticated coloured rats as pets, mainly, as Black observed, "to well-bred young ladies to keep in squirrel cages". Beatrix Potter is believed to have been one of his customers, and she dedicated the book Samuel Whiskers to her rat of the same name. The more sophisticated ladies of court kept their rats in dainty gilded cages, and even Queen Victoria herself kept a rat or two. It was in this way that domesticated—or fancy—rats were established. Black also supplied live rats for rat-baiting in pits, a popular mid-Victorian pastime.

Black had a number of sidelines beyond rats, including fishing (for food and supplying aquaria), bird catching and taxidermy. He was also an accomplished dog breeder. He told Mayhew: "I had a little rat dog—a black tan terrier of the name of Billy—which was the greatest stock dog in London of that day. He is the father of the greatest portion of the small black tan dogs in London now ... I've been offered a sovereign a-pound for some of my little terriers, but it wouldn't pay me at that price, for they weren't heavier than two or three pounds. I once sold one of the dogs, of this same strain, for fourteen pounds, to the Austrian Ambassador.  ... in fact, my terrier dog was known to all the London fancy. As rat-killing dogs, there's no equal to that strain of black tan terriers."

Establishment of fancy rats
Between the 1840s and 1860s Jemmy Shaw and Jack Black bred and sold many different colours of fancy rats and their work aided in the establishment of them as pets. The fancy rats proper did not begin until Mary Douglas asked for permission from the National Mouse Club to bring her pet rats to an exhibition at the Aylesbury Town Show on October 24, 1901. Her black and white hooded Rattus norvegicus won "Best in Show," and the Rat Fancy was formally launched. 

The original Rat Fancy lasted until 1931, as part of the National Mouse and Rat Club. The modern Rat Fancy was revived in 1976 with the formation of the National Fancy Rat Society, and the fancy rat spread around the world. Nowadays, fancy rats are widely accepted as pets and exhibition animals.

Pop culture
 Your Friend the Rat, a Pixar short film which briefly mentions Jack Black in the history of rats.

See also 

 Rat-baiting

References 

19th-century births
Year of death missing
People from Battersea
Rat-baiting